Sebastian Breza (born March 15, 1998) is a Canadian professional soccer player who plays as a goalkeeper for Serie C club Carrarese, on loan from Bologna.

Club career

Early career
Breza was nine years old when he started playing soccer at FS Salaberry.  As a youth, Breza played goaltender in both hockey and soccer. In 2016, he signed with Serie C club Monopoli, and was loaned to Serie A club Palermo in 2017, initially playing for the latter's Primavera side. Breza made three appearances on the bench for Palermo's first team squad in the 2016–17 Serie A season.

Potenza
In 2017, Breza signed for Serie D club Potenza, helping them gain promotion to Serie C for the 2018–19 season. During the offseason, he was rumoured to go to fellow Serie D club Taranto. In his second season, Breza largely played a backup role to Raffaele Ioime, but made 8 starts. In January 2020, Breza was linked with a move to Serie A club Bologna.

Bologna
On January 29, 2020, he joined Serie A club Bologna on loan until June 30, 2020. Bologna held an obligation to purchase his rights at the end of the loan.

Loan to CF Montréal
On April 6, 2021, Breza was loaned to CF Montréal of Major League Soccer for the 2021 season. He made his debut on August 8 against D.C. United. Breza was given the start in the semifinal of the 2021 Canadian Championship against Forge FC, and the game went to penalties after a 0-0 after 90 minutes. The shootout was still tied after 10 rounds, and Breza was able to stop the shot from Forge goalkeeper Triston Henry, before scoring himself to win the game and advance Montréal to the final. CF Montréal went on to win the Voyageurs Cup and Breza was honoured with the George Gross Memorial Trophy as the most valuable player of the tournament.

Upon completion of the 2021 season, CF Montréal announced they would not exercise the option to purchase Breza's contract. However, in January 2022 CF Montréal announced Breza would return to the club for the 2022 season on loan.

Loan to Carrarese
On 27 January 2023, Breza joined Serie C side Carrarese on loan until the end of the season.

International career
Breza was born in Canada to a Polish father and Norwegian mother, and holds dual citizenship with Canada and Norway. He attended his first camp for the Canadian U-20 team in 2016. Breza was named to the Canadian U-23
provisional roster for the 2020 CONCACAF Men's Olympic Qualifying Championship on February 26, 2020.

Career statistics

Honours
CF Montreal
 Canadian Championship: 2021
Individual
 George Gross Memorial Trophy: 2021

See also

 2020 CONCACAF Men's Olympic Qualifying Championship squads
 All-time CF Montréal roster

References

External links
 CF Montréal profile
 
 
 

1998 births
Living people
Canadian people of Polish descent
Canadian people of Norwegian descent
Canadian soccer players
Soccer players from Ottawa
Association football goalkeepers
S.S. Monopoli 1966 players
Palermo F.C. players
Potenza Calcio players
Bologna F.C. 1909 players
CF Montréal players
Serie C players
Serie D players
Major League Soccer players
Canada men's youth international soccer players
Canadian expatriate soccer players
Expatriate footballers in Italy
Canadian expatriate sportspeople in Italy
Carrarese Calcio players